Oscilla jocosa is a species of sea snail, a marine gastropod mollusk in the family Pyramidellidae, the pyrams and their allies.

Description
The length of the white, turriculated shell measures 2.5 mm. The protoconch is planorbid. The teleoconch contains five flattened whorls. The sculpture is marked by three rounded, slightly beaded, spiral cords. The columella has a marked tooth.

Distribution
This species occurs in the following locations:
 Gulf of Oman
 Mediterranean Sea, as an invasive species (off Haifa, Israel)

References

 van Aartsen J.J., Barash A. and Carrozza F., 1989. Addition to the knowledge of the Mediterranean mollusca of Israel and Sinai. Bollettino Malacologico, 25(1-4): 63–76.
 van Aartsen J. J., 1994. European Pyramidellidae: 4. The genera Eulimella, Anisocycla, Syrnola, Cingulina, Oscilla and Careliopsis. Bollettino Malacologico, 30(5-9): 85-110.
The Tibe Chrysallidini. ECIMAT (Estación de Ciencias Mariñas de Toralla) - Universidade de Vigo, 412 pp

External links
 To Biodiversity Heritage Library (4 publications)
 To CLEMAM
 To Encyclopedia of Life
 To World Register of Marine Species

Pyramidellidae
Gastropods described in 1904